The Brown family is an Argentine family of Scottish descent known for producing a number of high-profile footballers during the 1920s in Argentina.

Arrival in Argentina
On 22 May 1825, James Brown, Sr., a farm labourer, and his wife Mary (née Hope) left Leith, Scotland to start a new life in Argentina. On arriving in Argentina, the Browns settled in the short-lived British settlement of Monte Grande before moving to Buenos Aires after the failure of the settlement.

Footballing dynasty

James Brown Jr., the youngest son of James and Mary, fathered nine sons, seven of whom became footballers for Alumni Athletic Club. Five of those seven would also play internationally for Argentina. The eldest son to play football was Diego Hope (b. 1875). The next oldest, Jorge Gibson (b. 1880, nicknamed el Patricarcho) was the most accomplished member of the family. He would play in ten Argentine championships and representi Argentina 23 times. Jorge was treasurer of Alumni at the point it was disbanded. Jorge played in Argentina's first international in a match against Uruguay in Montevideo. The next oldest, Carlos Carr Brown (b. 1882), was the first to make an impact on Argentine football. Carlos learned his football in Britain before returning to Argentina and representing the national team twice. Tomás  (b. 1884) turned out for Alumni but was not capped internationally. Ernesto Alejandro (b. 1885; nicknamed el Pacifico for his peaceful nature) once scored six goals in a match for Alumni. The two youngest, Alfredo (b. 1886) and Eliseo (b. 1888), also played international football.

A cousin of the brothers, Juan Domingo, also played for Argentina during the same era. Between 1906 and 1916 Juan played 36 times for the national team.

In 1910 when Argentina played Uruguay in the Copa Centenario, three Browns played for Argentina: Jorge, Juan Domingo and Ernesto.

Family tree

References

 
Argentine people of Scottish descent
History of football in Argentina
Sports families of Argentina
Families of Scottish ancestry